The 1982 John Player League was the fourteenth competing of what was generally known as the Sunday League.  The competition was won for the first time by Sussex County Cricket Club.

Standings

Batting averages

Bowling averages

See also
Sunday League

References

John Player
Pro40